Hepburn is a city in Page County, Iowa, United States. The population was 26 at the time of the 2020 census.

History
Hepburn was platted in 1873, and a post office was opened that same year. It is named for William Peter Hepburn of Clarinda, Iowa, a Civil War veteran (Lt. Col., 2nd Regiment Iowa Volunteer Cavalry), and later a prominent Congressman and staunch political ally of Theodore Roosevelt.

Hepburn had a depot on the Chicago, Burlington and Quincy Railroad.

Geography
Hepburn is located at  (40.848537, -95.016803).

Demographics

2010 census
As of the census of 2010, there were 23 people, 8 households, and 7 families living in the city. The racial makeup of the city was 100.0% White.

There were 8 households, of which 50.0% had children under the age of 18 living with them, 87.5% were married couples living together, and 12.5% were non-families. 12.5% of all households were made up of individuals, and 12.5% had someone living alone who was 65 years of age or older. The average household size was 2.88 and the average family size was 3.14.

The median age in the city was 35.5 years. 34.8% of residents were under the age of 18; 0.0% were between the ages of 18 and 24; 26% were from 25 to 44; 26% were from 45 to 64; and 13% were 65 years of age or older. The gender makeup of the city was 43.5% male and 56.5% female.

2000 census
As of the census of 2000, there were 39 people, 15 households, and 10 families living in the city. The racial makeup of the city was 94.87% White, and 5.13% from two or more races. Hispanic or Latino of any race were 7.69% of the population.

There were 15 households, out of which 40.0% had children under the age of 18 living with them, 53.3% were married couples living together, 13.3% had a female householder with no husband present, and 33.3% were non-families. 13.3% of all households were made up of individuals, and none had someone living alone who was 65 years of age or older. The average household size was 2.60 and the average family size was 3.00.

28.2% are under the age of 18, 10.3% from 18 to 24, 15.4% from 25 to 44, 30.8% from 45 to 64, and 15.4% who were 65 years of age or older. The median age was 44 years. For every 100 females, there were 105.3 males. For every 100 females age 18 and over, there were 100.0 males.

The median income for a household in the city was $22,500, and the median income for a family was $10,833. Males had a median income of $28,125 versus $26,250 for females. The per capita income for the city was $13,629. There were 37.5% of families and 32.1% of the population living below the poverty line, including no under eighteens and 40.0% of those over 64.

Education
The Clarinda Community School District serves the municipality.

See also
McCoy Polygonal Barn, listed on the National Register of Historic Places.

References

Cities in Iowa
Cities in Page County, Iowa